Antonio Barceló y Pont de la Terra (1 January 1717, in Palma, Majorca – 30 January 1797, in idem) (in Catalan Antoni Barceló i Pont de la Terra) was a Spanish mariner, lieutenant general (equivalent to Admiral) of the Spanish Royal Armada.

He began as privateer at the service of the Spanish Empire and thanks to his merits, he became lieutenant general of the Spanish Royal Armada and fought against Algerians pirates.

He is famous for his anti-Algerian privateer campaigns, bombardments of Algiers (Bombardment of Algiers in August 1783 and 2nd Bombardment of Algiers in July 1784) and use of gunboats during the Great Siege of Gibraltar.

See also
Great Siege of Gibraltar
Gunboat

References

External links
College of the Theatine Fathers, the house where the Captain was born

1717 births
1797 deaths
Spanish generals
18th-century Spanish military personnel
Spanish admirals
Spanish military personnel of the American Revolutionary War
Military history of Gibraltar
People from Palma de Mallorca